The Tour of Vietnam was a multi-day road cycling race that was only held once, in 2012. It was part of UCI Asia Tour in category 2.2.

Winners

References

Cycle racing in Vietnam
UCI Asia Tour races
Recurring sporting events established in 2012
Defunct cycling races in Vietnam